Starksia elongata, the elongate blenny, is a species of labrisomid blenny native to reefs of the western Atlantic Ocean and the Caribbean Sea.  This species can reach a length of  SL.

References

elongata
Fish described in 1971